Wöbbelin was a subcamp of the Neuengamme concentration camp near the city of Ludwigslust. The SS had established Wöbbelin to house concentration camp prisoners whom the SS had evacuated from other camps to prevent their liberation by the Allies. At its height, Wöbbelin held some 5,000 inmates, most of whom were suffering from starvation and disease. The camp was freed on May 2, 1945.

History
In September 1944 a small camp was built—called aerie of egret (German: Reiherhorst)— for US prisoners of war. On 12 February 1945 a group of inmates were transported to build a larger camp, now called KZ Wöbbelin. The SS-physician Alfred Trzebinski stated during his trial, that 648 people were held at Wöbbelin camp until the end of March 1945. In mid-April several transports from subcamps of Neuengamme and Ravensbrück concentration camp with more than 4,000 inmates arrived. 

On May 2, 1945, the 8th Infantry Division and the 82nd Airborne Division encountered Wöbbelin. Living conditions in the camp when the U.S. 8th Infantry and the 82nd Airborne arrived were deplorable. There was little food or water and some prisoners had resorted to cannibalism. When the units arrived, they found about 1,000 inmates dead in the camp. In the aftermath, the U.S. Army ordered the townspeople in Ludwigslust to visit the camp and bury the dead.

On May 7, 1945, the 82nd Airborne Division conducted funeral services for 200 inmates in the town of Ludwigslust. Attending the ceremony were citizens of Ludwigslust, captured German officers, and several hundred members of the airborne division. The U.S. Army chaplain at the service delivered a eulogy stating that:

"The crimes here committed in the name of the German people and by their acquiescence were minor compared to those to be found in concentration camps elsewhere in Germany. Here there were no gas chambers, no crematoria; these men of Holland, Russia, Poland, Czechoslovakia, and France were simply allowed to starve to death. Within four miles of your comfortable homes 4,000 men were forced to live like animals, deprived even of the food you would give to your dogs. In three weeks 1,000 of these men were starved to death; 800 of them were buried in pits in the nearby woods. These 200 who lie before us in these graves were found piled four and five feet high in one building and lying with the sick and dying in other buildings."

In accordance with a policy mandated by General Dwight D. Eisenhower, the Supreme Commander of the Allied Forces, the U.S. Army in Ludwigslust ordered "all atrocity victims to be buried in a public place" with crosses placed at the graves of Christians and Stars of David on the Jewish graves, along with a stone monument to commemorate the dead.

See also
List of subcamps of Neuengamme

Notes

This article incorporates text from the United States Holocaust Memorial Museum, and has been released under the GFDL.

External links

United States Holocaust Memorial Museum - Wöbbelin
Mahn und Gedenkstaetten Woebbelin - Museum and Memorial at Woebbelin, Germany
Oral history interview with Morton Katz a member of the 82nd Airborne Division who helped liberate Wöbbelin Concentration Camp from the Veterans History Project at Central Connecticut State University
Oral history interview with Arthur Neriani a member of the 8th Infantry Division who helped liberate Wöbbelin Concentration Camp  from the Veterans History Project at Central Connecticut State University
 Online-Exhibition about Werner Angress by the Jewish Museum Berlin at the Google Cultural Institute - Werner Angress was involved as a US soldier in the liberation of the concentration camp Wöbbelin.

Subcamps of Neuengamme